Vella is a genus of plants in the family Brassicaceae, under which there are no fewer than six species. Species are many branched, and have hairy, sessile, entire leaves that are narrower in width at their bases, widening out to form ovals. Fruits are stiff follicles. Vella is endemic to that area of land encompassing Algeria, Morocco, and Spain.

Selected species
 Vella anremerica (Lit. & Maire) Gómez-Campo
 Vella bourgaeana (Coss.) Warwick & Al-Shehbaz
 Vella lucentina M.B.Crespo
 Vella mairei Humbert
 Vella pseudocytisus L. (type)
 Vella spinosa Boiss.
List source:

References

External links

 An illustration of Vella pseudocytisus (published in 1818), from plantillustrations.org

Brassicaceae
Brassicaceae genera